Dawang Lu Station is an interchange station between Line 1 and Line 14 of the Beijing Subway. As of 2013, Dawanglu Station was the most used entrance/exit point to the Beijing Subway, with about 160,000 entrances and exits per day.
 Line 14 station  was  opened on December 26, 2015.

Station layout 
Both the line 1 and line 14 stations have underground island platforms.

Exits 
There are seven exits, lettered A, B, C, D, E, F, and H. Exits D and E are accessible.

Future plan
Once complete, the station will also transfer to Line 28.

References

External links

Beijing Subway stations in Chaoyang District
Railway stations in China opened in 1999